Trier, formerly known in English as Trèves and Triers (see also names in other languages), is a city on the banks of the Moselle in Germany. It lies in a valley between low vine-covered hills of red sandstone in the west of the state of Rhineland-Palatinate, near the border with Luxembourg and within the important Moselle wine region.

Founded by the Celts in the late 4th century BC as Treuorum and conquered 300 years later by the Romans, who renamed it Augusta Treverorum ("The City of Augustus among the Treveri"), Trier is considered Germany's oldest city. It is also the oldest seat of a bishop north of the Alps. Trier was one of the four capitals of the Roman Empire during the Tetrarchy period in the late 3rd and early 4th centuries. In the Middle Ages, the archbishop-elector of Trier was an important prince of the Church who controlled land from the French border to the Rhine. The archbishop-elector of Trier also had great significance as one of the seven electors of the Holy Roman Empire. Because of its significance during the Roman and Holy Roman empires, several monuments and cathedrals within Trier are listed as a UNESCO World Heritage Site.

With an approximate population of 110,000, Trier is the fourth-largest city in its state, after Mainz, Ludwigshafen, and Koblenz. The nearest major cities are Luxembourg ( to the southwest), Saarbrücken ( southeast), and Koblenz ( northeast).

The University of Trier, the administration of the Trier-Saarburg district and the seat of the ADD (Aufsichts- und Dienstleistungsdirektion), which until 1999 was the borough authority of Trier, and the Academy of European Law (ERA) are all based in Trier. It is one of the five "central places" of the state of Rhineland-Palatinate. Along with Luxembourg, Metz and Saarbrücken, fellow constituent members of the QuattroPole union of cities, it is central to the greater region encompassing Saar-Lor-Lux (Saarland, Lorraine and Luxembourg), Rhineland-Palatinate, and Wallonia.

History 

The first traces of human settlement in the area of the city show evidence of linear pottery settlements dating from the early Neolithic period. Since the last pre-Christian centuries, members of the Celtic tribe of the Treveri settled in the area of today's Trier. The city of Trier derives its name from the later Latin locative in Trēverīs for earlier Augusta Treverorum. According to the Archbishops of Trier, in the Gesta Treverorum, the founder of the city of the Trevians is Trebeta. German historian Johannes Aventinus also credited Trebeta with building settlements at Metz, Mainz, Basel, Strasbourg, Speyer and Worms.

The name distinguished it from the empire's many other cities honoring the first Roman emperor, Augustus. The city later became the capital of the province of Belgic Gaul; after the Diocletian Reforms, it became the capital of the prefecture of the Gauls, overseeing much of the Western Roman Empire. In the 4th century, Trier was one of the largest cities in the Roman Empire with a population around 75,000 and perhaps as much as 100,000. The Porta Nigra ("Black Gate") dates from this era. A residence of the Western Roman emperor, Roman Trier was the birthplace of Saint Ambrose. Sometime between 395 and 418, probably in 407 the Roman administration moved the staff of the Praetorian Prefecture from Trier to Arles. The city continued to be inhabited but was not as prosperous as before. However, it remained the seat of a governor and had state factories for the production of ballistae and armor and woolen uniforms for the troops, clothing for the civil service, and high-quality garments for the Court. Northern Gaul was held by the Romans along a line (līmes) from north of Cologne to the coast at Boulogne through what is today southern Belgium until 460. South of this line, Roman control was firm, as evidenced by the continuing operation of the imperial arms factory at Amiens.

The Franks seized Trier from Roman administration in 459. In 870, it became part of Eastern Francia, which developed into the Holy Roman Empire. Relics of Saint Matthias brought to the city initiated widespread pilgrimages. The bishops of the city grew increasingly powerful and the Archbishopric of Trier was recognized as an electorate of the empire, one of the most powerful states of Germany. The University of Trier was founded in the city in 1473. In the 17th century, the Archbishops and Prince-Electors of Trier relocated their residences to Philippsburg Castle in Ehrenbreitstein, near Koblenz. A session of the Reichstag was held in Trier in 1512, during which the demarcation of the Imperial Circles was definitively established.

In the years from 1581 to 1593, the Trier witch trials were held. It was one of the four largest witch trials in Germany alongside the Fulda witch trials, the Würzburg witch trial, and the Bamberg witch trials, perhaps even the largest one in European history. The persecutions started in the diocese of Trier in 1581 and reached the city itself in 1587, where it was to lead to the death of about 368 people, and was as such perhaps the biggest mass execution in Europe in peacetime. This counts only those executed within the city itself. The exact number of people executed in all the witch hunts within the diocese has never been established; a total of 1,000 has been suggested but not confirmed.

In the 17th and 18th centuries, the French-Habsburg rivalry brought war to Trier. Spain and France fought over the city during the Thirty Years' War. The bishop was imprisoned by Spain and the Holy Roman Emperor for his support to France between 1635 and 1645. In later wars between the Empire and France, French troops occupied the city during the Nine Years' War, the War of the Spanish Succession, and the War of the Polish Succession. After conquering Trier again in 1794 during the French Revolutionary Wars, France annexed the city and the electoral archbishopric was dissolved. After the Napoleonic Wars ended in 1815, Trier passed to the Kingdom of Prussia. Karl Marx, the German philosopher and one of the founders of Marxism, was born in the city in 1818.

As part of the Prussian Rhineland, Trier developed economically during the 19th century. The city rose in revolt during the revolutions of 1848 in the German states, although the rebels were forced to concede. It became part of the German Empire in 1871.

The synagogue on Zuckerbergstrasse was looted during the November 1938 Kristallnacht and later completely destroyed in a bomb attack in 1944. Multiple Stolperstein have been installed in Trier to commemorate those murdered and exiled during the Shoah.

In June 1940 during World War II over 60,000 British prisoners of war, captured at Dunkirk and Northern France, were marched to Trier, which became a staging post for British soldiers headed for German prisoner-of-war camps. Trier was heavily bombed and bombarded in 1944. The city became part of the new state of Rhineland-Palatinate after the war. The university, dissolved in 1797, was restarted in the 1970s, while the Cathedral of Trier was reopened in 1974 after undergoing substantial and long-lasting renovations. Trier officially celebrated its 2,000th anniversary in 1984. On December 1, 2020, 5 people were killed by an allegedly drunk driver during a vehicle-ramming attack. 
The Ehrang/Quint district of Trier was heavily damaged and flooded during the July 16, 2021 floods of Germany, Belgium, The Netherlands and Luxembourg.

Trier sits in a hollow midway along the Moselle valley, with the most significant portion of the city on the east bank of the river. Wooded and vineyard-covered slopes stretch up to the Hunsrück plateau in the south and the Eifel in the north.

Neighbouring municipalities 
Listed in clockwise order, beginning with the northernmost; all municipalities belong to the Trier-Saarburg district

Schweich, Kenn and Longuich (all part of the Verbandsgemeinde Schweich an der Römischen Weinstraße), Mertesdorf, Kasel, Waldrach, Morscheid, Korlingen and Gusterath (all in the Verbandsgemeinde Ruwer), Hockweiler, Franzenheim (both part of the Verbandsgemeinde Trier-Land), Konz and Wasserliesch (both part of the Verbandsgemeinde Konz), Igel, Trierweiler, Aach, Newel, Kordel, Zemmer (all in the Verbandsgemeinde Trier-Land).

Organization of city districts 

The Trier urban area is divided into 19 city districts. For each district there is an Ortsbeirat (local council) of between 9 and 15 members, as well as an Ortsvorsteher (local representative). The local councils are charged with hearing the important issues that affect the district, although the final decision on any issue rests with the city council. The local councils nevertheless have the freedom to undertake limited measures within the bounds of their districts and their budgets.

The districts of Trier with area and inhabitants (December 31, 2009):

Climate 
Trier has an oceanic climate (Köppen: Cfb), but with greater extremes than the marine versions of northern Germany. Summers are warm except in unusual heat waves and winters are recurrently cold, but not harsh. Precipitation is high despite not being on the coast. As a result of the European heat wave in 2003, the highest temperature recorded was 39 °C on 8 August of that year. The lowest recorded temperature was −19.3 °C on February 2, 1956.

Main sights 

Trier is known for its well-preserved Roman and medieval buildings, which include:
 the Porta Nigra, the best-preserved Roman city gate north of the Alps;
 the Roman Trier Amphitheater;
 the 2nd century AD Roman bridge (Römerbrücke) across the Moselle, the oldest bridge north of the Alps still crossed by traffic;
 ruins of three Roman baths, among them the largest Roman baths north of the Alps; including the Barbara Baths, the Trier Imperial Baths, and the Forum Baths, Trier;
 Trier Cathedral ( or Dom St. Peter), a Catholic church that dates back to Roman times; its Romanesque west façade with an extra apse and four towers is imposing and has been copied repeatedly; the Cathedral is home to the Holy Tunic, a garment said to be the robe Jesus was wearing when he died, as well as many other relics and reliquaries in the Cathedral Treasury;
 the Liebfrauenkirche (German for Church of Our Lady), which is one of the most important early Gothic churches in Germany, in some ways comparable to the architectural tradition of the French Gothic cathedrals;
 St. Matthias' Abbey (Abtei St. Matthias), a still-in-use monastery in whose medieval church the only apostle north of the Alps is held to be buried;
 St. Gangolf's church is the city's 'own' church near the main market square (as opposed to the Cathedral, the bishop's church); largely Gothic;
 Saint Paulinus' Church, one of the most important Baroque churches in Rhineland-Palatinate and designed in part by the architect Balthasar Neumann;
 two old treadwheel cranes, one being the Gothic "Old Crane" (Alte Krahnen) or "Trier Moselle Crane" (Trierer Moselkrahn) from 1413, and the other the 1774 Baroque crane called the "(Old) Customs Crane" ((Alter) Zollkran) or "Younger Moselle Crane" (Jüngerer Moselkran) (see List of historical harbour cranes).

Museums 

 Rheinisches Landesmuseum (an important archaeological museum for the Roman period; also some early Christian and Romanesque sculpture);
 Domschatzkammer (Treasury of Trier Cathedral; with the Egbert Shrine, the reliquary of the Holy Nail, the cup of Saint Helena and other reliquaries, liturgical objects, ivories, manuscripts, etc., many from the Middle Ages);
 Museum am Dom, formerly Bischöfliches Dom- und Diözesanmuseum (Museum of the Diocese of Trier; religious art, also some Roman artefacts);
 Stadtmuseum Simeonstift (history of Trier, displaying among other exhibits a scale model of the medieval city);
 Karl Marx House; a museum exhibiting Marx's personal history, volumes of poetry, original letters, and photographs with personal dedications. There is also a collection of rare first editions and international editions of his works, as well as exhibits on the development of socialism in the 19th century;
 Toy Museum of Trier;
 Ethnological and open-air museum Roscheider Hof, a museum in the neighbouring town of Konz, right at the city limits of Trier, which shows the history of rural culture in the northwest Rhineland Palatinate and in the area where Germany, Luxembourg and Lorraine meet;
 Fell Exhibition Slate Mine; site in the municipality of Fell,  from Trier, containing an underground mine, a mine museum, and a slate mining trail.

Education 

Trier is home to the University of Trier, founded in 1473, closed in 1796 and restarted in 1970. The city also has the Trier University of Applied Sciences. The Academy of European Law (ERA) was established in 1992 and provides training in European law to legal practitioners.
In 2010 there were about 40 Kindergärten, 25 primary schools and 23 secondary schools in Trier, such as the Humboldt Gymnasium Trier, Max Planck Gymnasium, Auguste Viktoria Gymnasium and the Nelson-Mandela Realschule Plus, Kurfürst-Balduin Realschule Plus, Realschule Plus Ehrang.

Annual events 
 Until 2014, Trier was home to Germany's largest Roman festival, Brot und Spiele (German for Bread and Games – a translation of the famous Latin phrase panem et circenses from the satires of Juvenal).
 Trier has been the base for the German round of the World Rally Championship since 2002, with the rally's presentation held next to the Porta Nigra.
 Trier holds a Christmas street festival every year called the Trier Christmas Market on the Hauptmarkt (Main Market Square) and the Domfreihof in front of the Cathedral of Trier.

Culture 
Trier has a municipal theatre, Theater Trier, for musical theatre, plays and dance.

Transport
Trier station has direct railway connections to many cities in the region. The nearest cities by train are Cologne, Saarbrücken and Luxembourg. Via the motorways A 1, A 48 and A 64 Trier is linked with Koblenz, Saarbrücken and Luxembourg. The nearest commercial (international) airports are in Luxembourg (0:40 h by car), Frankfurt-Hahn (1:00 h), Saarbrücken (1:00 h), Frankfurt (2:00 h) and Cologne/Bonn (2:00 h). The Moselle is an important waterway and is also used for river cruises. A new passenger railway service on the western side of the Mosel is scheduled to open in December 2018.

Sports

Major sports clubs in Trier include:
SV Eintracht Trier 05, association football
Gladiators Trier, basketball (former TBB Trier)
DJK/MJC Trier, women's team handball
Trier Cardinals, baseball
PST Trier Stampers, American Football
FSV Trier-Tarforst, intera alia football and rugby

International relations
Trier is a fellow member of the QuattroPole union of cities, along with Luxembourg, Saarbrücken and Metz (neighbouring countries: Luxembourg and France).

Twin towns – sister cities

Trier is twinned with:

 Metz, France (1957)
 Gloucester, England, UK (1957)
 Ascoli Piceno, Italy (1958)
 's-Hertogenbosch, Netherlands (1968)
 Pula, Croatia (1971)
 Fort Worth, United States (1987)
 Weimar, Germany (1990)
 Nagaoka, Japan (2006)
 Xiamen, China (2010)

Namesakes
 New Trier Township, Illinois, USA, originally settled by people from Trier.
 New Trier, Minnesota, USA, settled by people from Trier about 1856.
 New Trier High School, an Illinois school named after Trier.

Notable people

Eucharius (died c. 250), first bishop of Trier
Constantius Chlorus (c. 250–306), Roman emperor
Maximian (c. 250–310), Roman emperor
Valerius (died 320), second bishop of Trier
Helena (c. 250–330), saint, mother of Constantine the Great (residence in Trier by tradition)
Athanasius of Alexandria (296/298–373), saint (in exile ca. 335)
Paulinus (died 358), bishop of Trier
Valentinian I (321–375), Roman emperor
Ausonius (c. 310–395), Roman consul and poet
Ambrose (c. 340–397), saint
Apronia of Toul (6th century), nun and saint
Saint Modesta (died c. 680), founder and Abbess of the monastery of Oeren
Kaspar Olevianus (1536–1587), theologian
Heinrich Marx (1777–1838), lawyer, father of Karl Marx
Henriette Marx (1788–1863), mother of Karl Marx
Johann Anton Ramboux (1790–1866), painter
Jenny Marx (1814–1881), revolutionary, drama critic
Karl Marx (1818–1883), social philosopher and revolutionary
August Beer (1825–1863), scientist
Frederick A. Schroeder (1833–1899), American politician, mayor of Brooklyn
Hans am Ende (1864–1918), painter
Ludwig Kaas (1881–1952), Catholic priest and politician (Zentrum)
Oswald von Nell-Breuning (1890–1991), theologian
Charles de Gaulle (1890–1970), General and French statesman, as commander of a battalion of Chasseurs during the French occupation of Rhineland
Reinhard Heß (1904–1998), painter and glass painter
Wolf Graf von Baudissin (1907–1993), general, military planner and peace researcher
Peter Thullen (1907–1996), German-Ecuadorian mathematician
Klaus Barbie (1913–1991), SS and Gestapo functionary
Gitta Lind (1925–1974), singer
Reinhold Bartel (1926–1996), operatic tenor
Ernst Huberty (born 1927), sports reporter
Günther Steines (1928–1982), athlete
Franz Grundheber (born 1937), baritone
Otmar Seul (born 1943), lawyer, professor
Helga Zepp-LaRouche (born 1948), journalist and politician
Xavier Bout de Marnhac (born 1951), French general, former commander of KFOR
Robert Zimmer (born 1953), philosopher and essayist
Ernst Ulrich Deuker (born 1954), musician
François Weigel (born 1964), French pianist, composer and conductor
Eric Jelen (born 1965), tennis player
Martin Bambauer (born 1970), church musician
Frank Findeiß (born 1971), poet
Anja Kaesmacher (born 1974), operatic soprano

References

Further reading
Heinz Monz: Trierer Biographisches Lexikon. Landesarchivverwaltung Rheinland-Pfalz, Koblenz 2000. 539 p. .

External links

 

 
10s BC establishments in the Roman Empire
Cities in Rhineland-Palatinate
Gallia Belgica
Landmarks in Germany
Populated places established in the 1st century BC
Roman towns and cities in Germany
World Heritage Sites in Germany